Calingasta is a department of the province of San Juan (Argentina). It is the southwestern corner of the province, which is predominantly a landscape of mountains and rivers. It is characterized by its production of apples and by tourism, mainly in the tourist towns of Barreal and Tamberías

Origin of name 
Several meanings that have been given to indigenous root of this word. People of the inhabitants of Calían. Skirt or safe or major hills. Transforming Catalve "(River of the hillside), as the area was called Calingasta prior to the arrival of the Spaniards.

Geography  
The department Calingasta comprises the southwest corner of the province of San Juan. Its boundaries are:

 To the north with the Iglesia Department
 To the south with the Mendoza Province
 To the east with the departments of  Sarmiento,  Zonda, and  Ullum
 To the west with the Republic of Chile

Relief
Calingasta has a rugged, hilly topography due to its location is at the foot of the Andes. It is possible to highlight an area precordillerana lower height as the first with numerous mountain cave highlight the Sierra del Tontal. The soil is mainly desert with little vegetation cover except on the river banks in the valleys.

Climate
The climate is mostly desert with little precipitation, highlighting marked thermal amplitudes, with notable differences in temperature between night and day, a major solar radiation.

Departments of San Juan Province, Argentina